Dakhala is a town in Kamrup district of Assam, situated on the south bank of the Brahmaputra River.

See also
 Bijoynagar City

References

Cities and towns in Kamrup district